The GCC Champions League, is an annually organized football league tournament for club of the Arabian peninsula.

The 2009 edition is the 25th time that it has been organized. The tournament format has changed from the 2008 edition, from two groups of 5 teams to four groups of three teams.

The Groups

The draw was made on 18 July 2009 in Bahrain.

Four groups of three teams.

Winners qualify for the semi-finals.

Fixtures And Results

Group stage games are played on a home and away basis between September and December
Group winners enter a two legged semi-final stage

Group A

Results

Group B

Results

Group C

Results

Group D

Results

Semi-finals

1st Legs

2nd Legs

Final

1st Legs

2nd Legs

Winner

Top goalscorers

Source: Goalzz.com

References

2009
2009 in Asian football
2010 in Asian football